Imre Timkó (13 August 1920 – 30 March 1988) was a Hungarian Greek Catholic hierarch. He was bishop of the Hungarian Greek Catholic Eparchy of Hajdúdorog from 1972 to 1988 and Apostolic Administrator of Apostolic Exarchate of Miskolc from 1972 to 1988.

Born in Budapest, Hungary in 1920, he was ordained a priest on 8 December 1945. He was appointed the Bishop by the Holy See on 7 January 1975. He was consecrated to the Episcopate on 8 February 1975. The principal consecrator was Bishop Joakim Segedi, and the principal co-consecrators were Archbishop József Ijjas and Archbishop József Bánk.

He died in Nyíregyháza on 30 March 1988.

References

1920 births
1988 deaths
20th-century Eastern Catholic bishops
Hungarian Eastern Catholics
Hungarian bishops
Clergy from Budapest
Bishops of the Hungarian Greek Catholic Church